Worldpay is the name of two related companies:

 Worldpay Group, a former UK company, which was acquired by Vantiv to form the American company Worldpay, Inc.
 Worldpay, Inc., a former US company now acquired and merged into Fidelity National Information Services (FIS)